Mandirajawetan is a village in the town of Mandiraja, Banjarnegara Regency, Central Java Province, Indonesia. This village has an area of 150.85 hectares and a population of 4,474 inhabitants in 2010.

References

External links
 Banjarnegara Regency Official Website

Banjarnegara Regency
Villages in Central Java